Vibeke Karlsen (born 1 August 1967) is a Norwegian football referee.

She took up refereeing in 1983, has officiated in the Toppserien since 1992 and was a FIFA referee from 1996 to 2004. She officiated in Euro 1997 and the 2000 Olympic Games. She resides in Nesbru, and represents SF Grei.

References

1967 births
Living people
Norwegian football referees
Women association football referees